Ilkley is a rural locality in the Sunshine Coast Region, Queensland, Australia.

History 
Following the establishment of a settlement there about 1890, the locality was named Ilkley after Ilkey in Yorkshire, England, the home town of the local preacher Joseph Kitson.

Ilkley Provisional School opened on 25 November 1901, becoming Ilkley State School on 1 January 1909. In 1924, it briefly became a part-time school sharing a teacher with Chevallum State School. After that, Ilkley State School remained a full-time school until its final closure in 1964.

References

External links 
 

Suburbs of the Sunshine Coast Region
Localities in Queensland